Tuheljske Toplice  is a village in Croatia.

References

Populated places in Krapina-Zagorje County
Spa towns in Croatia